Splendrillia otagoensis is a species of sea snail, a marine gastropod mollusk in the family Drilliidae.

Description
The length of the shell attains 7.5 mm, its diameter 3 mm.

Distribution
This marine species is endemic to New Zealand and occurs off Bay of Plenty, off Oamaru, Otago and Stewart Island.

References

 Powell, Arthur William Baden. The New Zealand Recent and Fossil Mollusca of the Family Turridae: With General Notes on Turrid Nomenclature and Systematics. No. 2. Unity Press limited, printers, 1942.
 Powell, A.W.B. 1979: New Zealand Mollusca: Marine, Land and Freshwater Shells, Collins, Auckland

External links
 Spencer H.G., Willan R.C., Marshall B.A. & Murray T.J. (2011). Checklist of the Recent Mollusca Recorded from the New Zealand Exclusive Economic Zone

otagoensis
Gastropods of New Zealand
Gastropods described in 1942